Muddy Run is a tributary of the West Branch Susquehanna River in Northumberland County, Pennsylvania, in the United States. The creek is several miles northeast of the community of Milton. Main land uses include agricultural land and forest. Muddy Run is entirely within Turbot Township. Most of the rock in the watershed is shale. The most common soil series is the Berks-Weikert-Bedington series.

Course

Muddy Run begins in a valley in eastern Turbot Township, near the Paradise Church. The creek heads westward before turning south and then southwest. It crosses under Interstate 80 and turns due west again. After some distance, the creek crosses under Pennsylvania Route 147 and turns northwest past a country club. North of the country club, it turns abruptly north and then west again, crossing under Pennsylvania Route 405 and entering the West Branch Susquehanna River.

Tributaries
Muddy Run's main tributaries are unnamed.

Hydrology
The Hoeganaes Corporation, in the northwestern part of the watershed, is the only entity permitted to discharge sediment in the Muddy Run watershed. A total of  comes from developed land,  comes from forests, and  comes from wetlands.

Geology
In the Muddy Run watershed, 90% of the rock is shale from the Bloomsburg/Mifflinburg Formation Undivided and the Wills Creek Formation. The remaining 10% is composed of siltstone and limestone from the Keyser/Tonoloway Formation Undivided. Most of the western part of the watershed is on the Bloomsburg/Mifflinburg Formation Undivided, with the exception of a band in the central-western part of the watershed, which is on the Wills Creek Formation. The Keyser/Tonoloway Formation Undivided occurs in an area in the northeastern part of the watershed. The rest of the watershed is on the Wills Creek Formation.

The main soil series in the Muddy Run watershed is the Berks-Weikert-Bedington, which is a silt-loam with shale. Other soil types in the watershed include the Chenango-Pope-Holly series, the Hagerstown-Edom-Washington series, and the Leck Kill-Meckesville-Calvin series. The Berks-Weikert-Bedington series occurs in the central and northwestern part of the watershed. The Chenango-Pope-Holly series is found in an area in the extreme western area of the watershed. The Hagerstown-Edom-Washington series is found in the eastern section of the watershed. The Leck Kill-Meckesville-Calvin soil series occurs in the southwestern and north-central areas of the watershed.

The stream banks of Muddy Run are eroded in some locations.

Watershed
In specific, 3402.6 acres of the watershed are for growing crops, 2083.1 acres are for hay or pastures, 1045.3 acres are forest, and 630.1 acres are considered "low-intensity development" by the Environmental Protection Agency. 93.9 acres are turf, 37.1 acres are considered "transition" by the Environmental Protection Agency, and 17.3 acres are wetland. Much of the forest and developed land is in the western half of the watershed.

The main roads in the Muddy Run watershed are Interstate 80, Pennsylvania Route 147 in the western part of the watershed, and a number of township roads throughout the watershed. The watershed occupies part of Milton Township, Turbot Township, Delaware Township in Northumberland County. It also occupies a small area of western Limestone Township, in Montour County.

History
The first mill in Turbot Township was built on Muddy Run by Hawkins Boone some time before 1779. In 1785, Cornelius Waldron and his son Laffert arrived at the mouth of Muddy Run. Laffert Waldron later purchased a tract of farmland on the creek. In 1840, Abraham Straub moved a gristmill to a location on the creek. The Muddy Run school was historically located on Muddy Run.

Fort Boone was built at the mouth of Muddy Run.

Part of the area Muddy Run flowed through was historically referred to as "Paradise".

Biology
There are no riparian buffers in certain areas along Muddy Run. Livestock such as cattle have unlimited access to the creek in some places.

See also
Limestone Run (Montour and Northumberland Counties, Pennsylvania), next tributary of the West Branch Susquehanna River going downriver
Warrior Run (West Branch Susquehanna River), next tributary of the West Branch Susquehanna River going upriver
List of rivers of Pennsylvania

References

Rivers of Northumberland County, Pennsylvania
Tributaries of the West Branch Susquehanna River
Rivers of Pennsylvania